The 2009–10 Buffalo Bulls basketball team represents the University at Buffalo in the 2009–10 college basketball season.  The team is coached by Reggie Witherspoon and plays its home games in Alumni Arena.

Before the season

Roster Changes

Recruiting

Roster

Coaching staff

Schedule

Notes

Buffalo Bulls men's basketball seasons
Buffalo Bulls